Raoul Dandurand,  (November 4, 1861 – March 11, 1942) was a Canadian politician and longtime organizer in Quebec for the Liberal Party of Canada.

Biography

Dandurand graduated from the Faculty of Law at Université Laval, and worked as a corporate lawyer in Quebec.

Dandurand, a Montreal lawyer, was appointed to the Senate of Canada in 1898 by Sir Wilfrid Laurier. He served as Speaker of the Senate of Canada from 1905 to 1909 and was either Leader of the Government in the Canadian Senate or Leader of the Opposition in the Canadian Senate from 1921 until 1942. As Government Leader in the Senate he served in every Cabinet formed by William Lyon Mackenzie King from 1921 until Dandurand's death in 1942.
 
He also served as President of the League of Nations Assembly in 1925 and was Canada's delegate to the League's council from 1927 to 1930. He is perhaps best remembered for having said, in 1924, that in international affairs Canada was “a fireproof house, far from inflammable materials.”

King relied heavily on Dandurand and Ernest Lapointe for advice on Quebec as well as on international affairs and it was Dandurand who suggested Louis St. Laurent for King's Cabinet after Lapointe's death.

After his death, he was entombed at the Notre Dame des Neiges Cemetery in Montreal.

Family
In January 1886, Dandurand married Joséphine Marchand, daughter of Quebec premier and dramatist Hon Félix-Gabriel Marchand and his wife, Marie Herselie Turgeon. Josephine was born in Saint-Jean, Quebec, and was educated at the Convent of Les Dames de la Congregation de Notre Dame a branch of Villa-Maria. Her literary works included dramatic pieces, papers and essays on subjects of public interest and in relation to women's duties, rights and place. She founded and edited Le Coin du Feu, a women's paper.

She was a member and office-bearer of the National Council of Women of Canada, in which she advanced practical schemes for the promotion of the industrial and fine arts in Canada and the establishment of a Department of Art. She was a member and office-bearer of the Women's Historical Society, the Victorian Order of Nurses. She was President of the Crèche of the Sisters of Mercy, Montreal, Quebec. In 1898, she was created an Officier Academic by the French government. In 1900, she was appointed as a Commissioner from the Canadian government of Canada to the Paris Exposition in Ottawa. In March 1903, she delivered an address before the Alliance française on "La Sociabilite."

Archives 
There is a Dandurand-Marchand collection at Library and Archives Canada.

See also
Université Laval

References

External links 
 
 

1861 births
1942 deaths
Speakers of the Senate of Canada
Canadian senators from Quebec
Lawyers from Montreal
Members of the King's Privy Council for Canada
Politicians from Montreal
Université Laval alumni
Canadian members of the Privy Council of the United Kingdom
Canadian King's Counsel
Grand Officiers of the Légion d'honneur
Commanders of the Order of the Crown (Belgium)
Recipients of the Order of St. Sava
Recipients of the Order of Polonia Restituta
Burials at Notre Dame des Neiges Cemetery